"Niagara" is a two-part episode of the sixth season of the American comedy series The Office. It is the 4th and 5th episodes in the season's episode count and the 104th and 105th episode of the series overall. The episode was written by executive producer Greg Daniels and Mindy Kaling, and was directed by Paul Feig. It originally aired on October 8, 2009 on NBC in the United States.

The episode revolves around the wedding of Jim and Pam at Niagara Falls. Not all goes smoothly when Jim accidentally reveals Pam's pregnancy to all the guests, including Pam's very old-fashioned grandmother, and Andy injures his scrotum while dancing. Meanwhile, Michael and Dwight both try to hook up with women, with mixed results.

The episode was met with positive reviews from critics and fans. Although not all television critics reacted positively to Andy's dancing injury sub-plot, "Niagara" has nonetheless come to be considered a classic episode of the series. In a poll conducted by OfficeTally at the end of season six, the episode was named the second best episode of the series after the second-season finale, "Casino Night." The episode was viewed by 9.42 million households with a 4.8 rating/12% share in the 18–49 demographic making it the second highest viewed episode of the season after "The Delivery."

Synopsis
Jim Halpert (John Krasinski) and Pam Beesly (Jenna Fischer) head up to Niagara Falls for their wedding and the rest of the office follows them. Michael Scott (Steve Carell) and Dwight Schrute (Rainn Wilson) seek women to hook up with while Andy Bernard (Ed Helms) pursues Erin Hannon (Ellie Kemper). Kevin Malone (Brian Baumgartner) and Oscar Martinez (Oscar Nunez) meet Pam's sister Penny (Anna Camp), who accidentally offends Oscar by thinking Kevin was his boyfriend Gil. Pam's mother Helene (Linda Purl) is visibly disturbed at the fact that Pam's father and Helene's ex-husband, William (Rick Overton) has come to the wedding with his new girlfriend who is half his own age.

Pam's grandmother, "Meemaw", or "Sylvia", (played by Peggy Stewart), is a woman of conservative morals, so everyone is told not to mention Pam's pregnancy. At the rehearsal dinner, Jim gives a moving toast to his soon-to-be wife. However, he finishes by saying that everyone but Pam will drink to the toast "for obvious reasons". Meemaw questions this remark, and after fumbling through several weak excuses Jim finally admits that Pam is pregnant. Michael tries to fix the issue by saying they had "lots of consensual sex" but Meemaw remains offended. Meemaw then decides not to attend the wedding out of moral outrage. Michael later visits Meemaw in her hotel room. Despite his indelicate approach to the subject of sex, he establishes an instant rapport with Meemaw and convinces her to attend the wedding.

Andy hosts a dance party in his room later that night, with the office staff attending. Andy punctures his scrotum trying to do a split. The guests rouse Pam, the only sober person, to take him to the hospital. Pam reluctantly agrees, but Andy still whines throughout the drive to the hospital.

Michael and Dwight try their luck with women at the bar. Dwight, by using sexual innuendo, is successful in getting Pam's friend Isabel (Kelen Coleman) to spend the night with him. Michael spends the night alone in the ice machine room, having thought the "room block" at the hotel meant pre-reserved rooms for the wedding guests and not a bulk discounted room rate and thus failed to make a reservation in advance, and couldn't convince anyone else to let him room with them; Dwight, because he failed an honesty test, Stanley, because he brought his mistress and just plain refused, while Toby willingly offered but Michael disgustedly rejected immediately.

Prior to the ceremony, Pam accidentally tears her veil and tearfully phones Jim. They meet in private, where Pam expresses shame at her appearance due to being pregnant. Pam is visibly uplifted when Jim cuts his tie in half in an effort to console her, and says she regrets inviting their families and the office staff. They run away from the church together.

While everyone in the church wonders where they went, Michael and Helene begin to bond over their failed relationships. Dwight callously rebuffs Isabel's attempts at further contact. The rest of the office staff grow impatient, bickering about their right to take their gifts back.

Jim and Pam finally return to the church after an hour with no explanation of their absence, and the ceremony begins. The guests interrupt the ceremony by recreating the dance routines featured in the JK Wedding Entrance Dance. Jim and Pam react with uncharacteristic good humor, having already been married on board the Maid of the Mist IV ferry boat by the ship's captain, below the falls. Jim explains to the camera that he had prepared the ferry marriage in advance after seeing the video, predicting the guests might imitate it.

When Kevin leaves his only pair of shoes in the care of hotel staff, the management decides to incinerate them as a health hazard, and he replaces them with Kleenex tissue boxes. The end of the episode shows Kevin soothing his feet in the ice machine. While he speaks to the camera crew, Helene is seen pulling Michael into her hotel room.

Production
The episode was written by Greg Daniels and Mindy Kaling, who plays Kelly Kapoor on the show, and directed by Paul Feig, his 13th directing credit for the series. The episode was initially assigned to Kaling, but Daniels said he was interested in contributing. The scene in which Jim cuts his tie off took seven takes.

Cultural references
The dance down the church aisle to Chris Brown's "Forever" is based on the popular 2009 YouTube viral video, "JK Wedding Entrance Dance", in which a young couple (JK, standing for "Jill and Kevin") dance down the aisle to the song along with their wedding party. Pam mentions that the song was specifically put on a "Do Not Play List", but was choreographed by the wedding guests and office workers regardless. The song played during Andy's party is Kardinal Offishall's "Numba 1 (Tide is High)" featuring Rihanna. Dwight is shown wearing the Three Wolf Moon T-shirt, made famous by humorous reviews on Amazon, before going out to the hotel bar with Michael to pick up women, commenting that "it's suggestive to women, because of howling during sex."

Reception
In its original American broadcast, "Niagara" was viewed by an estimated 9.42 million households, with a 4.8 rating and a 12 share in the 18–49 demographic coming second in its timeslot after Grey's Anatomy. Greg Daniels and Mindy Kaling received a Primetime Emmy Award nomination for Outstanding Writing for a Comedy Series for their work on "Niagara" at the 62nd Primetime Emmy Awards, but lost to Modern Familys Steven Levitan and Christopher Lloyd for their work on the pilot episode.

The episode received positive reviews from critics. The episode ranked 24th on BuddyTV's list of best 50 episodes of 2009 with them saying "It wasn't easy, but they did it all, creating a goofy, joyful, and special day for Jim and Pam that brought tears to our eyes." Dan Phillips of IGN gave the episode an 8.3 saying calling it "Impressive" and "The episode certainly could have delivered more in terms of creativity and high comedy, but it still contained a great deal of entertainment." Despite that, he said the episode failed in comparison to "Phyllis' Wedding". Nathan Rabin of The A.V. Club gave  the episode a B. "Niagara" was voted the second highest rated out of 115 from the series through season six, according to a poll at the fansite OfficeTally.

References

External links
"Niagara" at NBC.com

2009 American television episodes
The Office (American season 6) episodes
Niagara Falls in fiction
The Office (American TV series) episodes in multiple parts
Television episodes about weddings
Television episodes directed by Paul Feig